Mya Thaw (born 13 November 1955) is a Burmese dental professor who served as Rector of the University of Dental Medicine, Yangon from 1998 to 2009.

Biography
Mya Thaw was born in Rangoon, Myanmar on 13 November 1955. He graduated from University of Dental Medicine, Yangon in July, 1972.

He married Khin Win May, a dentist. They have one daughter and one son. His son Zayar Thaw is a House of Representatives MP.

See also
 Myanmar Dental Association
 Myanmar Dental Council
 University of Dental Medicine, Mandalay
 University of Dental Medicine, Yangon

References

Burmese dental professors
1955 births
Living people
People from Yangon